Sofia Dmitrievna Tikhonova (born 16 November 1998) is a Russian ski jumper who has competed at World Cup level since the 2013/14 season.

Career
Tikhonova's best individual World Cup result is fourth place in Lillehammer on 5 December 2014; her best team result is third in Zaō on 20 January 2018.

At the Junior World Championships, she won an individual gold medal and a team silver medal in 2015, individual bronze in 2016, and team silver in 2018. At the Winter Youth Olympics, she won individual silver in 2016. At the European Youth Olympic Festival, she won individual gold and mixed team silver in 2015.

References

1998 births
Living people
Sportspeople from Saint Petersburg
Russian female ski jumpers
Ski jumpers at the 2016 Winter Youth Olympics
Ski jumpers at the 2018 Winter Olympics
Ski jumpers at the 2022 Winter Olympics
Olympic ski jumpers of Russia
Youth Olympic gold medalists for Russia